Kenny Wayne Shepherd (born Kenny Wayne Brobst; June 12, 1977) is an American guitarist, singer, and songwriter. He has released several studio albums and experienced significant commercial success as a blues artist.

Life and career
Shepherd was born in Shreveport, Louisiana. He graduated from Caddo Magnet High School in Shreveport. He is "completely self-taught",
 and does not read music. Growing up, Shepherd's father (Ken Shepherd) was a local radio personality and some-time concert promoter, and had a vast collection of music. Shepherd received his first "guitar" at the age of three or four, when his grandmother purchased a series of several plastic guitars for him with S&H Green Stamps, which Shepherd has said he would "go through like candy".

Shepherd stated in a 2011 interview that he began playing guitar in earnest at age seven, about six months after meeting and being "pretty mesmerized" by Stevie Ray Vaughan, Labor Day weekend in 1984, at one of his father's promoted concerts. His self-taught method employed a process of learning one note at a time, playing and rewinding cassette tapes, using "a cheap Yamaha wanna-be Stratocaster ... made out of plywood, basically", and learning to play by following along with material from his father's record collection.

Blues musician Bryan Lee invited 13 years old Shepherd to play guitar onstage. He subsequently made demo tapes, and a video was shot at Shepherd's first performance at the Red River Revel Arts Festival in Shreveport. It was this video performance that impressed Giant Records chief Irving Azoff enough to sign Shepherd to a multiple album record deal.

From 1995 on, Shepherd took seven singles into the Top 10, and holds the record for the longest-running album on the Billboard Blues Charts with Trouble Is.... In 1996, Shepherd began a longtime collaboration with vocalist Noah Hunt, who provided the vocals for Shepherd's signature song, "Blue on Black". Shepherd has been nominated for five Grammy Awards, and has received two Billboard Music Awards, two Blues Music Awards, and two Orville H. Gibson Awards.

In 2000, Shepherd played guitar on the end title theme for the animated feature Batman Beyond: Return of the Joker.

In September 2008, Fender Musical Instruments Corp. released the Kenny Wayne Shepherd Signature Series Stratocaster, designed exclusively by Shepherd. In 2007, he released a critically acclaimed and two-time Grammy nominated DVD–CD project, 10 Days Out: Blues from the Backroads. This documents Shepherd as he travels the country to jam with and interview the last of the authentic blues musicians. As they tour the backroads, Shepherd, with members of the Double Trouble Band, play with a host of blues greats including Clarence "Gatemouth" Brown and Bryan Lee, Buddy Flett (with whom he jams at Lead Belly's grave), B. B. King, blues harp master Jerry "Boogie" McCain, Cootie Stark, Neal Pattman, John Dee Holeman, Etta Baker, Henry Townsend with Honeyboy Edwards, and a concert session with the surviving members of Muddy Waters' and Howlin' Wolf's bands, including Hubert Sumlin, Willie "Big Eyes" Smith, and Pinetop Perkins. 
In 2010, Shepherd was nominated for a Grammy for Live in Chicago, which featured performances with Hubert Sumlin, Willie "Big Eyes" Smith, Buddy Flett, and Bryan Lee. In 2011, Shepherd released his seventh CD, titled How I Go, on Roadrunner Records. In 2014 he released "Goin Home" on Mascot Label Group in Europe and on Concord Records in the US and the rest of the world. In 2015 Shepherd released "Something From the Road Vol. 1," a live special release for Record Store Day in the U.S.

In January 2017, the Kenny Wayne Shepherd Band went into the studio with producer Marshall Altman to record a new album of all newly written songs titled Lay It On Down and released the album on August 4 (July 21 in Europe on Mascot Label Group). Lay It On Down is the eighth record by the Kenny Wayne Shepherd Band to debut at No. 1 on the Billboard Blues Chart.

Shepherd made his Edinburgh Jazz & Blues Festival debut on 16 July 2019.

On May 31, 2019, Shepherd released The Traveler on Concord Records and Mascot Label Group in Europe.  The album, like the previous release Lay It On Down, was co-produced by Marshall Altman. The Traveler was chosen as a 'Favorite Blues Album' by AllMusic.

Shepherd headlined the 2020 Mahindra Blues Festival, along with Buddy Guy, Larkin Poe and Keb Mo.

On December 2, 2022, Shepherd released Trouble Is... 25, a complete re-recording of his sophomore album for its 25th anniversary. The album includes a never before heard cover of Bob Dylan's "Ballad Of A Thin Man."

The Rides
In 2013, Shepherd, along with Stephen Stills (Crosby, Stills & Nash) and Barry Goldberg (Electric Flag), formed The Rides. They released their debut album Can't Get Enough on August 27, 2013. Stills refers to the band as "the blues band of my dreams." The band toured the US in 2013 supporting their debut record, culminating with an appearance on The Tonight Show with Jay Leno. The three reunited in 2015 for a follow-up album Pierced Arrow, released on 429 Records and Mascot Label Group in Europe in 2016.

Personal life
Shepherd married Hannah Gibson, the oldest daughter of actor Mel Gibson, on September 16, 2006. The couple has six children.

Blues Foundation controversy

In March 2021, the Blues Foundation revoked Kenny Wayne Shepherd’s 2021 Blues Music Awards nomination for Best Blues/Rock Artist. According to a statement from the organization, the decision was made over Confederate flag imagery displayed on Shepherd’s The Dukes of Hazzard “General Lee” car replica.

Shepherd acknowledged the offensiveness of the flag on his car and said he had permanently covered it some time ago. "Years ago I put that car in permanent storage and some time ago, I made the decision to permanently cover the flag on my car because it was completely against my values and offensive to the African American community which created the music I love so much and I apologize to anyone that I have unintentionally hurt because of it." In addition to the Foundation’s rescindment of Shepherd’s nomination, the organization has asked Shepherd’s father, Ken Shepherd, to step down as a member of its board of directors. Ken Shepherd declined to comment on being asked to step down.

Live performances
 2019 touring with Buddy Guy
Shepherd and his band teamed up with vocalist Beth Hart and her band in a double-headliner tour along the US east coast in Summer 2018.
Shepherd was the opening act for Van Halen on their 1998 tour and again on their Van Halen 2015 North American Tour.
Shepherd undertook a double-headliner tour in Summer 2015 with Jonny Lang.
 Shepherd made a trip of ten days in the U.S. to meet and play with his idols: B.B. King, Clarence "Gatemouth" Brown, Hubert Sumlin, Pinetop Perkins, Henry Townsend, Honeyboy Edwards, Cootie Stark, Neal Pattman, Etta Baker, Jerry "Boogie" McCain, Buddy Flett, Bryan Lee, John Dee Holeman, and the Howlin' Wolf and Muddy Waters Bands. This effort would later become his fifth album, 10 Days Out: Blues From the Backroads. 
 Shepherd and Bryan Lee appeared as the musical guest on The Tonight Show with Jay Leno on February 14, 2007.
On July 24, 2007, he opened for Lynyrd Skynyrd at the Orange County Fair.
He was the opening act for The Rolling Stones during a stint of their 1999 No Security Tour.
Shepherd performed some of his songs including a cover of Jimi Hendrix's "Voodoo Child" at the Dutch Mason Blues Festival in 2007 and 2009.
He has also opened for Aerosmith, Bob Dylan, the Eagles (originally on the Hell Freezes Over Tour), and Van Halen.
Late Night with Jimmy Fallon performance, Nov 2010 - Shepherd sat in with house band, playing the actual white Stratocaster Jimi Hendrix used during his historic performance at Woodstock.
On January 15, 2011, Shepherd performed a live set for "Guitar Center Sessions" on DirecTV. The episode included an interview with Shepherd by program host, Nic Harcourt.
 Shepherd appeared at the Experience Hendrix tribute concert in Mesa Arizona on May 23, 2011.
 Shepherd opened for BB King in Atlanta's Chastain Park Amphitheater on July 4, 1999.
 Trouble Is... 25th Anniversary Concert at the Strand Theatre, Shreveport, LA February 12, 2022

Discography

Studio albums

Live albums

EPs

Singles

References

External links

Official website
Ten Days Out
[ Shepherd biography] at Allmusic website

1977 births
Living people
Writers from Shreveport, Louisiana
Musicians from Shreveport, Louisiana
Louisiana blues musicians
American blues guitarists
American male guitarists
Electric blues musicians
G3 (tour)
Blues rock musicians
Roadrunner Records artists
People from Bell Canyon, California
Guitarists from Louisiana
Provogue Records artists
The Rides members